"A Roller Skating Jam Named "Saturdays"" is a song by American hip hop trio De La Soul, released as the first single from their second studio album, De La Soul Is Dead (1991). The track includes vocal contributions from rapper Q-Tip, R&B singer Vinia Mojica and entrepreneur Russell Simmons. The track's composition is built around many samples. The song was generally well-received by critics. The song peaked at number twenty-two on the UK Singles Chart and at numbers six and forty three on the United States Billboard Hot Dance Club Play and Hot R&B/Hip Hop Songs charts respectively.

Conception and composition
The song's lyrics were written by Paul "Prince Paul" Huston, Kelvin "Posdnuos" Mercer, David "Dave" Jude Jolicoeur, Vincent "Maseo" Mason and Jonathan "Q-Tip" Davis, and produced by Prince Paul. The title of the song derives from the roller skating fad of the 1970s, as well as a prominent sample of "Saturday in the Park" originally recorded by American rock band Chicago.

Posdnuos and Dave of the group rap verses on the track, and other musical contributions are made by rapper Q-Tip, who raps the first verse of the track and vocalist Vinia Mojica, who sings the chorus. The intro of the song features Def Jam co-founder Russell Simmons - in non-musical capacity - as a DJ from fictional radio station "WRMS". The song is considered a collaboration from the Native Tongues posse, as De La Soul, Q-Tip and Mojica are all members.

The themes of the song's lyrics revolve around roller skating and the joy of weekends, compared to darker themes explored throughout De La Soul Is Dead to try to debunk their "daisy-age" image caused by the themes of their previous album 3 Feet High and Rising. Because of this, the track has been described as one of the more light-hearted tracks on the album.

The song's main beat is based around a sample of a riff from soul group The Mighty Ryeders' "Evil Vibrations" (1978); because of this, the group's frontman, Rodney Matthews, is given songwriting credit on the song. Aside from this the song samples:
 Vocals and a horn riff from disco singer Frankie Valli's "Grease"
 Vocals from rock band Chicago's "Saturday in the Park" (1972)
 Funk band Young-Holt Unlimited's "Light My Fire" (1969)
 Horns from "I Got My Mind Made Up" by funk band Instant Funk
 A drum break from funk band Tower of Power's "Ebony Jam" (1975)
 A vocal sample from Chic's "Good Times" (1979)
 A scratch sample from The Fearless Four's "F-4000" (1983)

All of these samples except the latter three are credited in the liner notes.

Critical reception
Pan-European magazine Music & Media wrote, "Second single from the album De La Soul Is Dead, the follow-up of the European hit single, Ring Ring Ring (Ha Ha Hey), has a relaxing lazy beat. Guest singer Vinija Mojica plays the leading role. Grease by Frankie Valli is the most prominent sample they use this time."

Track listing

 12" single/cassette single
A1 "What Yo Life Can Truly Be" (featuring A Tribe Called Quest and Dres) - 4:58
Samples:
"Shining Star" by Earth, Wind & Fire
"Ebony Jam" by Tower of Power
"Feel the Heartbeat" by The Treacherous Three
Theme from the animated TV series The Woody Woodpecker Show

A2 "Who's Skatin' Promo" (featuring Big Daddy Kane, Dres and Russell Simmons) - 2:48
A3 "A Roller Skating Jam Named "Saturdays"" (Ladies Nite Decision) (featuring Q-Tip) - 4:11
A4 "A Roller Skating Jam Named "Saturdays"" (LP Version) (featuring Q-Tip) - 4:02
B1 "A Roller Skating Jam Named "Saturdays"" (Radio Home Mix) (featuring Q-Tip) - 3:42
B2 "A Roller Skating Jam Named "Saturdays"" (Dave's Home Mix) (featuring Q-Tip) - 6:23
B3 "A Roller Skating Jam Named "Saturdays"" (6:00 AM Mix) (featuring Q-Tip) - 6:07
B4 "A Roller Skating Jam Named "Saturdays" (Mo Mo Dub) (featuring Q-Tip) - 6:03

 7" single
A "A Roller Skating Jam Named "Saturdays"" (Disco Fever Edit) - 4:04
B "A Roller Skating Jam Named "Saturdays"" (Radio Home Mix)  3:42

 CD single
 "A Roller Skating Jam Named "Saturdays"" (LP Version) (featuring Q-Tip) - 4:02
 "A Roller Skating Jam Named "Saturdays"" (Radio Home Mix) (featuring Q-Tip) - 3:42
 "A Roller Skating Jam Named "Saturdays" (Ladies Nite Decision) (featuring Q-Tip) - 4:11
 "A Roller Skating Jam Named "Saturdays"" (6:00 AM Mix) (featuring Q-Tip) - 6:07
 "Who's Skatin' Promo" (featuring Big Daddy Kane, Dres and Russell Simmons) - 2:48
 "A Roller Skating Jam Named "Saturdays"" (Dave's Home Mix) (featuring Q-Tip) - 6:23
 "What Yo Life Can Truly Be" (featuring A Tribe Called Quest and Dres) - 4:58
 "A Roller Skating Jam Named "Saturdays" (Mo Mo Dub) (featuring Q-Tip) - 6:03

Charts

References

1991 singles
De La Soul songs
Q-Tip (musician) songs
Song recordings produced by Prince Paul (producer)
1991 songs
Tommy Boy Records singles
Songs written by Vincent Mason
Songs written by Kelvin Mercer
Songs written by Prince Paul (producer)
Songs written by Q-Tip (musician)